Goodland-Grant Township Public Library, also known as the Mitten Memorial Building, is a historic library building located at Goodland, Newton County, Indiana.  It was built in 1931, and is a one-story, rectangular, Colonial Revival style steel frame building on a raised basement.  It has hollow tile walls, is sheathed in limestone, and has a slate gable roof.

It was listed on the National Register of Historic Places in 2004.

References

Libraries on the National Register of Historic Places in Indiana
Colonial Revival architecture in Indiana
Library buildings completed in 1931
Buildings and structures in Newton County, Indiana
National Register of Historic Places in Newton County, Indiana